Healthcare in Ahmedabad is provided through several hospitals and medical colleges - both government and private. In addition to providing healthcare to the Gujarat population, Ahmedabad also focuses on medical tourism and in 2009 received about 1,500 visitors from outside the state, including some from abroad.

Ahmedabad Civil Hospital
Opened in 1953, Ahmedabad Civil Hospital is the largest hospital in Asia. Civil Hospital is housed in a sprawling  area, has 2,800 beds facility, where over 1.3 million patients are treated and nearly 80 thousand surgeries performed annually. It also has autonomous kidney, cancer, heart, eye, paraplegia, dental and TB hospitals located on the same campus, if all are taken into account, the number of beds goes up to 3,500. A proposal has been drawn up by Gujarat government to seek World Bank aid for a nine-storey 2,000-bed building on Civil Hospital premises, raising its capacity to 4,800 beds - making it the world's largest hospital.

Sheth Vadilal Sarabhai General Hospital (VS Hospital)
VS Hospital is a multi-activity and multi-specialty hospital, which was the vision of Vadilal Sarabhai. The hospital was founded in year 1931 with an initial capital of 400,000 Rupees. It has 1,115 beds and is run by AMC and a committee consisting of members of the Sarabhai and Chinai families who had donated the hospital to the city. Over 500,000 patients are treated here annually, averaging 1,600 patients a day. Also 25,000 surgeries are performed every year.
Plans are underway to expand the hospital capacity by building two new towers which will increase capacity by 2000 beds. The hospital caters to areas in and around Ahmedabad with an average radius of 180 kilometers.  Being near to the national highway, VS hospital is the center for significant trauma management. Moreover, it is the only government hospital in Ahmedabad which caters to vascular injuries ( limb salvage). It has a significant patient input by emergency 108 services in Ahmedabad .
On 17th Jan 2019, Prime Minister of India, Narendra Modi, inaugurated Sardar Vallabhbhai Patel Institute of Medical Science and Research, a 17-floor building built at cost of 750 crore by Ahmadabad Municipal Corporation, that features 1500-bed, 32 high class operation theaters, 139 ICU-beds, 90 consultation room and a helipad for air-ambulance.

Other prominent/major hospitals in the city

Sorted alphabetical 
ADORN cosmetic surgery & hair transplant centre
ADORN Cosmetic Clinic
Ahmedabad Heart Hospital
Akhandanand Ayurvedic Hospital
 Apex Heart Institute
 Apollo Hospital - SPS Apollo Hospital
 Bapunagar General Hospital ESI
BAPS Yogiji Maharaj Hospital
  Care Institute of Medical Sciences  (CIMS Hospital)
  Dr Jivraj Mehta Hospital and medical research
  Eklavya ayurved multispeciality panchkarma centre
 Gujarat Research & Medical Institute Rajasthan Hospitals
 Guru Teg Bahadur Hospital
Government (CL&SC) Spine Institute Hospital
 HCG Cancer Hospital
Sneh Women's Hospital & IVF Centre
KD Hospital (Kusum Dhirajlal Hospital)
 Krishna Heart Institute
 Mental Hospital
Narayana Multi Speciality Hospital
 Nova Pulse IVF Clinic
 Pulse Women's Hospital
 Rajasthan Hospital
 SAL Hospital
 FIC Healthcare Solutions LLP
 Seth L.G. Municipal General Hospital
 Seth C.H. Nagari Eye Hospital
 Sharda Ben Municipal General Hospital
 Sterling Hospital
 The Gujarat Cancer Society
 Wellspring IVF & Women’s Hospital 
 Zydus Hospital
 Sardar Vallabhbhai Patel Hospital (SVP Hospital)

References